was a Japanese serial killer. Between March 31, 1971 and May 10, 1971, he raped and murdered eight women. He used a pen name, Tanigawa Ivan (谷川伊凡).

Early life 
Ōkubo was born in Takasaki, Gunma Prefecture. He was a quarter Russian. His mother, who was half Russian and half Japanese, doted on him even after he grew up. He was bullied by other children after the Pacific War began on December 8, 1941. He raped a woman on July 12, 1955. On December 26, 1955, he attempted to rape another woman, but was unsuccessful. He was arrested, put in jail, and then released on December 15, 1959. On April 16, 1960, he attempted to rape another woman, but was again unsuccessful. The victim, however, withdrew the charge. On May 5, 1961, he married a woman and had a son and a daughter. He threatened a man on June 3, 1965, and then raped two women on December 23, 1966 and February 24, 1967. On June 7, 1967, he went to prison. He was released on March 3, 1971.

Murders
Between March 31 and May 10, 1971, he killed eight women. On May 13, a 21-year-old woman disappeared, and her brother traced her. He found Ōkubo and the police finally arrested him on May 14, 1971. 
 Miyako Tsuda (津田 美也子 Tsuda Miyako) - 17 years old
 Mieko Oikawa (老川 美枝子 Oikawa Mieko) - 17 years old
 Chieko Ida (伊田 千恵子 Ida Chieko) - 19 years old
 Seiko Kawabata (川端 成子 Kawabata Seiko) - 17 years old
 Akemi Sato (佐藤 明美 Satō Akemi) - 16 years old
 Kazuyo Kawaho (川保 和代 Kawaho Kazuyo) - 18 years old
 Reiko Takemura (竹村 礼子 Takemura Reiko) - 21 years old
 Naoko Takanohashi (鷹嘴 直子 Takanohashi Naoko) - 21 years old

Trial and execution
The district court in Maebashi sentenced Ōkubo to death by hanging on February 22, 1973. He did not appeal and was executed on January 22, 1976. It was reported that he couldn't stand up on the day of his execution.

TV drama 
On August 29, 1983, Ōkubo's crime became a TV drama, . Takeshi Kitano played Ōkubo in the drama.

See also
List of serial killers by country

External links 
 Profile Laboratory: Kiyoshi Ōkubo  
 Serial murders of Kiyoshi Ōkubo  

1935 births
1976 deaths
20th-century executions by Japan
Executed Japanese serial killers
Japanese people convicted of murder
Japanese murderers of children
Japanese people of Russian descent
Japanese rapists
Male serial killers
People convicted of murder by Japan
People executed by Japan by hanging
People from Takasaki, Gunma